3 Regiment RLC is a regiment of the British Army's Royal Logistic Corps.

History 
The 3rd Regiment of the Royal Logistic Corps was originally formed as part of Royal Corps of Transport in 1965. The regiment was renamed 3rd Division Transport Regiment in 1970, 3rd Armoured Division Transport Regiment in 1977 and 3rd Regiment RLC in 1993.

The regiment provided logistical support for 1st Armoured Infantry Brigade.

In October 2021 personnel from the regiment were deployed to Thurrock in Essex as part of Operation Escalin.  The regiment provided fuel deliver drivers and trained with the logistics company Hoyers.

Structure 
The organisational structure of the regiment is as follows:
35 Headquarters Squadron
21 General Support Squadron
31 Close Support Squadron
32 Close Support Squadron

References

External links 
Website

Regiments of the Royal Logistic Corps
Military units and formations established in 1965